Bhavani Prakash is an Indian actress in the Kannada film industry, and a theatre artist in Karnataka, India.

Awards

Selected filmography
 Urvi (2017)
 putani party(2009)
  gubbacchigalu (2008)
Attihannu Mattu Kanaja (2014)
Traataka (2018)
Java (2018)
yellow board (2022)
sold (2022)
kannadiga (2022)
taledanda (2022)
hadineelentu (2022)
chikkiya muguthi
hagga
ale
raate
paramaatma
kranthiveera
4N6
bayaluseeme
noodi swamy ivaniroode heege

Serials 

Devi 

kicchu

mahamayi

nammamma sharade

katheyondu shuruvaagide

arundhati

Adithi rao

gundyan hendthi

neelaambari

See also

List of people from Karnataka
Cinema of Karnataka
List of Indian film actresses
Cinema of India

References

External links

21st-century Indian actresses
Actresses from Karnataka
Actresses in Kannada cinema
Filmfare Awards South winners
Indian film actresses
Kannada people
Living people
Year of birth missing (living people)